The Chilingirian Quartet is a British string quartet. It gave its first public concert in Cambridge in 1972. By the time the quartet celebrated its 50th anniversary in 2022, there had been various changes in the line-up. However, it has continued to be led by Levon Chilingirian.

History 
Founded in 1971 in London, it became a resident quartet of the University of Liverpool (1973–1976) after taking lessons with Siegmund Nissel from the Amadeus Quartet. In 1976 they won the International Competition for Young Concert Artists and became resident quartet of the Royal College of Music of London.

Festival appearances 
The quartet had a long-term association with the Lake District Summer Music Festival from its inception in 1985. They were also involved with the Scottish chamber music festival "Mendelssohn on Mull" of which Levon Chilingirian was artistic director from 2003 to 20016.

Members 
 Levon Chilingirian* first violin
 Mark Butler, Ronald Birks (2009–2020), second violin
 Simon Rowland-Jones*, Csaba Erlalyi (1980–1987), Louise Williams (1987–), Susie Mészáros, Asdis Valdimarsdottir, viola
 Philip De Groote* Stephen Orton (2013– )  cello

Note: * = founder member

Premieres 
Mouvement pour quatuor à cordes 1988 by Alain Daniel.
Closer 1988 by Frédérick Martin

Recordings
Amongst other recordings a box set of LPs of Schubert's last three quartets was issued by Nimbus Records on Nimbus2301/2/3 from 1978 studio performances where Simon Rowland-Jones was the violist.

Source 
 Alain Pâris, Dictionnaire des interprètes, series Bouquins, Éditions Robert Laffont 1989,

References

External links 
 Chilingirian Quartet Home page
 Discography on Discogs
 Chilingirian Quartet, more details on Hyperion
 Chilingirian Quartet  (BBC)
 Chilingirian Quartet, Haydn Opus 76 No 3 (YouTube)

British string quartets
Musical groups established in 1971